Lad is a village in Somogy county, Hungary.

Gallery

External links 

 Street map (Hungarian)

References 

Populated places in Somogy County
Hungarian German communities in Somogy County